The Brown Girl is Child ballad 295.

Synopsis

The brown-skinned girl received a letter from her lover, telling her that he was rejecting her for a more beautiful woman.  Then she received another, saying he was dying and summoning her.  She told him she was delighted at his dying.

Recording
Recorded by Dawn Landes for The 78 Project in the Brooklyn Botanic Garden on September 1, 2011.

This is on the Steeleye Span 1976 album Rocket Cottage.

Recorded and released by Angeline Morrison, May 2022.

See also
 List of the Child Ballads

External links
The Brown Girl

Child Ballads
Year of song unknown
Songwriter unknown